Marmaroplegma conspersa is a moth in the family Eupterotidae described by Per Olof Christopher Aurivillius in 1921. It is found in South Africa.

References

Endemic moths of South Africa
Moths described in 1921
Eupterotinae